Abdul Latif Mohammed (born 22 January 1990) is a Ghanaian professional footballer who plays for Equatorial Guinean club Futuro Kings FC as a midfielder.

Career
Latif Mohammed has played for several Ghanaian teams and Gabon club as a left full back and midfielder.

International career
In November 2013, coach Maxwell Konadu invited him to be a part of the Ghana squad for the 2013 WAFU Nations Cup. He helped the team to a first-place finish after Ghana beat Senegal by three goals to one.
In January 2014 he also help the Ghana team for the African cup of Nations and was the runners up.

References

1990 births
Living people
Ghanaian footballers
Association football midfielders
Futuro Kings FC players
Ghana international footballers
WAFU Nations Cup players
Ghanaian expatriate footballers
Ghanaian expatriate sportspeople in Equatorial Guinea
Expatriate footballers in Equatorial Guinea
Ghana A' international footballers
2014 African Nations Championship players
Expatriate footballers in Finland
Ghanaian expatriate sportspeople in Finland
Ghanaian expatriate sportspeople in Gabon
Ghanaian expatriate sportspeople in Zambia
Ghanaian expatriate sportspeople in Ethiopia
Expatriate footballers in Gabon
Expatriate footballers in Ethiopia
Expatriate footballers in Zambia